Vasilyevka is a rural locality (a village) in Petrovsky Selsoviet, Ishimbaysky District, Bashkortostan, Russia. The population was 729 as of 2010. There are 7 streets.

Geography 
Vasilyevka is located 41 km northeast of Ishimbay (the district's administrative centre) by road. Kalmakovo is the nearest rural locality.

References 

Rural localities in Ishimbaysky District